This is a list of International 14 sailboat championships.

Fleet Racing World Championship

Team Racing World Championship

References

International 14
World championships in sailing